Amt Odervorland is an Amt ("collective municipality") in the district of Oder-Spree, in Brandenburg, Germany. Its seat is in Briesen.

The Amt Odervorland consists of the following municipalities:
Berkenbrück
Briesen 
Jacobsdorf
Steinhöfel

Demography

References

Odervorland
Oder-Spree